Elizabethtown was a small, now extinct town in Washington Township, Delaware County, Indiana, United States.  The town was platted in the early 19th century and was located along the north bank of the Mississinewa river in section 12, of Washington Township, in Delaware County, Indiana.

History

The town was platted in the early 1800s by Joseph Wilson and named in honor of his daughter, Elizabeth Wilson. The town's central economic activity was centered on a flour mill and a saw mill. The town's inhabitants had hoped for the village to become the county seat of either Blackford or Delaware County.  Blackford County chose Hartford City and Delaware county chose Muncie.  The town slowly declined in the middle of the 19th century and ceased to exist at the beginning of the 20th. The only existing remnant of the town is the adjacent Elizabethtown Cemetery.

Geography

Elizabethtown was located at 40°22'29.12" North, -85°27'40.34" West (40.374091,-85.461258).  Currently a farm field, the town was located just north of the bend in the Mississinewa River.

References

External links

Former populated places in Delaware County, Indiana
Former populated places in Indiana
19th-century establishments in Indiana
Populated places established in the 19th century